Newlands is a suburb of Johannesburg, South Africa.  It is located in the province of Gauteng.

History
Prior to the discovery of gold on the Witwatersrand in 1886, the suburb lay on land on one of the original farms called Waterval. The suburb was established in 1897 by J.J.P. Ackermann.

See also
Newlands, a suburb of Cape Town
Newlands, a suburb of Pretoria

References

Johannesburg Region B